The women's freestyle 59 kilograms is a competition featured at the 2002 World Wrestling Championships and was held at the Tasos Kampouris Hall in Chalcis, Greece from 2 to 3 November 2002.

Results

Preliminary round

Pool 1

Pool 2

Pool 3

Pool 4

Pool 5

Pool 6

Pool 7

Pool 8

Knockout round

References

Women's freestyle 59 kg